9 Squadron or 9th Squadron may refer to:

Aviation units
 No. 9 Squadron RAAF, Australia
 9 Squadron (Belgium)
 No. 9 Squadron IAF, India
 9th Squadron (Iraq)
 No. 9 Squadron RNZAF, New Zealand 
 No. 9 Squadron PAF, Pakistan
 No. 9 Squadron SLAF, Sri Lanka
 No. 9 Squadron RAF, United Kingdom
 9th Aero Squadron, Air Service, United States Army
 9th Attack Squadron, United States Air Force
 9th Airlift Squadron, United States Air Force
 9th Bomb Squadron, United States Air Force
 9th Combat Operations Squadron, United States Air Force
 9th Fighter Squadron, United States Air Force
 9th Operational Weather Squadron, United States Air Force
 9th Space Operations Squadron, United States Air Force
 9th Special Operations Squadron, United States Air Force

Other units
 9 Parachute Squadron RE, Royal Engineers, British Army
 Helicopter Anti-Submarine Squadron 9 or HS-9, United States Navy